The 2018 Atlanta United FC season was the second season of Atlanta United FC's existence, and the tenth year that a professional soccer club from Atlanta, Georgia competed in the top division of American soccer. Atlanta played their home matches at Mercedes-Benz Stadium and were coached by Gerardo "Tata" Martino. Outside of MLS, the team participated in the 2018 U.S. Open Cup and the 2018 MLS Cup Playoffs, as well as various preseason competitions.

On November 17, 2017, Atlanta United announced the launch of a reserve team, Atlanta United 2, to play in what is currently named the USL Championship at the start of the 2018 season.

With a win over Chicago Fire on October 21, Atlanta qualified for the 2019 CONCACAF Champions League by having the best aggregate record across the 2017 and 2018 MLS seasons. The club later qualified for the competition by winning MLS Cup 2018, so their previously-held spot was allocated to the team with the second best aggregate record, New York Red Bulls.

Club

International roster slots 
Atlanta had seven International Roster Slots at the end of the 2018 season. Josef Martínez occupied an International Roster Slot until July 9, when he received a green card, making him a domestic player for MLS roster purposes. Jon Gallagher occupied an International Roster Slot until August 19, when he was sent on loan to Atlanta United 2 and José Hernández was recalled from the second team to replace Gallagher.

Results

Non-competitive

Friendlies

Carolina Challenge Cup

Competitive

Major League Soccer

League tables

Eastern Conference

Overall

Results summary

Results by round

Matches

MLS Cup Playoffs

U.S. Open Cup

Statistics

Top scorers

Disciplinary record

Player movement

In

SuperDraft picks 
Draft picks are not automatically signed to the team roster. Only trades involving draft picks and executed after the start of 2018 MLS SuperDraft will be listed in the notes. Atlanta had four selections in the draft.

Loan in

Out 
Per Major League Soccer and club policies terms of the deals do not get disclosed.

Loan out 

Due to a surplus of players under contract that required an International Roster Slot, Oliver Shannon was loaned to Atlanta United 2 for the full 2018 season. In addition, as part of Eric Remedi's incoming transfer, José Hernández was officially loaned to Atlanta United 2. Neither player could be recalled to the first team without an additional corresponding roster transaction. Players on the first team roster were able play for the second team without restriction.

On August 19, Hernández was in the matchday squad for the first team's match against the Columbus Crew. In order for this to be in compliance with league roster rules, Atlanta had to send forward Jon Gallagher on loan to Atlanta United 2 for the rest of the season and recall Hernández from the second team.

Non-player transfers

Honors

Weekly / monthly

MLS player of the month

MLS team / player / coach of the week

MLS goal of the week

Annual

References

Atlanta United FC seasons
Atlanta United
MLS Cup champion seasons
Atlanta United
Atlanta United FC